The François Tomb is an important painted Etruscan tomb from the Ponte Rotto Necropolis in the Etruscan city of Vulci, Lazio, in central Italy. It was discovered in 1857 by Alessandro François and Adolphe Noël des Vergers. It dates to the last quarter of the fourth century BC.  The tomb seems to belong to the Etruscan family of the Saties (or Seties) and one of its chief occupants is Vel Saties, who appears with his dwarf, Arnza.

Its outstanding frescoes are significant both iconographically and also in terms of their comments on Etruscan history and identity. 

The tomb contains a fresco depicting Caelius Vibenna (whom the Romans believed the Caelian Hill was named after) and Mastarna (a legendary figure whom the Emperor Claudius identified with Servius Tullius). The tomb paintings include a representation of 'Marce Camitlas' (Latin equivalent 'Marcus Camillus') about to draw his sword against a crouching 'Cneve Tarchunies Rumach' ('Gnaeus Tarquinius of Rome'). The ancient histories of Rome do not include any reference to a 'Gnaeus Tarquinius'.

The frescos were removed by Prince Torlonia soon after their discovery and were kept in the Torlonia Museum (Rome). Since 1946, they have been stored at the private Villa Albani in Rome as part of the Torlonia collection.

Some pottery vessels from the tomb are now in the British Museum.

References

Sources 

Bloom, Marcia G. 1974. The François tomb at Vulci, an Etrusco-Hellenistic monument. Thesis/dissertation, University of Pennsylvania.
Holliday, Peter James. 1993. Narrative and event in ancient art. Cambridge University Press.

Further reading
http://www.instoria.it/home/FrancoisII.htm
http://www.mysteriousetruscans.com/francois.html
Bridgeman Art Library v. Corel Corp.
F. Messerschmidt, A. von Gerkan, Nekropolen von Vulci, Berlin, 1930; 
M.Cristofani, research on paintings of François Vulci grave. The decorative friezes, in Diala, 1, 1967, pp. 189–219
S. Steingräber, Catalogue raisonné of Etruscan painting, Milan, 1984, pp. 380–387;
Peter J. Holliday, Narrative structures in the François tomb, in Narrative and event in ancient art, Cambridge, 1988, pp. 175–197; 
F. Coarelli, Revixit Ars. Art and Ideology in Rome. By Hellenistic models to the republican tradition, Rome, 1996, pp. 138–178; 
S. Steingräber, Etruscan frescoes, from the geometric to the Hellenistic period, San Giovanni Lupatoto, 2006, pp. 68 et seq;

Etruscan artefacts
Etruscan tombs
Archaeological sites in Lazio
1857 archaeological discoveries
Vulci